Fred Bild  is a former Canadian diplomat and current adjunct professor at the University of Montreal Centre of East Asian Studies, CÉTASE. He graduated from Concordia University (Montreal). He has a diploma of International from University College, London and a foreign student's diploma from the École nationale d'administration in Paris.

He has held diplomatic appointments in Japan, Korea, at the International Control Commission in Indochina, and France.  He was Canadian Ambassador in Thailand (1979–83), with concurrent appointment to Laos, to the Socialist Republic of Vietnam and Myanmar.  In 1990 he was appointed as Ambassador to the People's Republic of China and to Mongolia.

References

External links 
 Foreign Affairs and International Trade Canada Complete List of Posts 
 Personnel list at University of Montreal Centre for East Asian Studies (French)

Sir George Williams University alumni
Living people
Academic staff of the Université de Montréal
Year of birth missing (living people)
Ambassadors of Canada to Laos
Ambassadors of Canada to Myanmar
Ambassadors of Canada to Thailand
Ambassadors of Canada to Vietnam
Ambassadors of Canada to China
Ambassadors of Canada to Mongolia